Berdsk Vega Production Association is a company based in Berdsk, Russia and established in 1959.

The Berdsk Vega Production Association is one of the largest producers of domestic radios and tape recorders for civil and military use in Russia. Vega includes the Berdsk Radio Plant and its Special Microelectronics Design and Technological Bureau. In the 1990s Vega added compact disc players to its line of stereo electronics.

References

External links
 Official website

Electronics companies of Russia
Companies based in Novosibirsk Oblast
Electronics companies of the Soviet Union
Ministry of Radio Industry (Soviet Union)
Electronics companies established in 1959
Audio equipment manufacturers of Russia
Berdsk